Ələsgər (also, Alesker) is a village in the Zaqatala Rayon of Azerbaijan.  The village forms part of the municipality of Mamrux.

References

External links

Populated places in Zaqatala District